Clarence Edmond Jaquith (February 24, 1896 – March 27, 1993) was an American track and field athlete who competed in the 1920 Summer Olympics. In 1920 he finished 15th in the triple jump competition.

References

External links
List of American athletes

1896 births
1993 deaths
American male triple jumpers
Olympic track and field athletes of the United States
Athletes (track and field) at the 1920 Summer Olympics